The Panay monitor (Varanus mabitang) is an endangered monitor lizard native to Panay Island in the Philippines. Unlike most monitors, it is a specialized frugivore.

Distribution and habitat
The Panay monitor occurs only on Panay, inhabiting remnant forests in the northwestern and western mountain ranges at altitudes of 200–1000 m. It is highly arboreal and dependent on primary forest ecosystems.

Description

Conservation
The species is classified as Endangered by the IUCN. It appears to be greatly impacted by habitat loss, and is also a favoured hunting target. The species appears to be rare; only twelve animals have been caught since 2002. There are ongoing conservation efforts being carried out on the island.

References

External links

 Giant Frugivorous Monitor Lizards in the Philippines

Fauna of Panay
Endemic fauna of the Philippines
Reptiles of the Philippines
Reptiles described in 2001
	Varanus